Avion Express is a Lithuanian ACMI and aircraft leasing operator headquartered in Vilnius. The company is a part of Avia Solutions Group, a global aerospace business group.

History
Avion Express was established in 2005 as Nordic Solutions Air Services. At that time, the airline was operating four Saab 340 cargo and passenger aircraft. In 2008 the company was re-branded to its current name Avion Express. In 2010 Avion Express was acquired by French investment company Eyjafjoll SAS, formed by Avion Capital Partners of Switzerland along with other investors.

In 2011 Avion Express introduced its first Airbus A320, which was the first Airbus aircraft to be registered in Lithuania. In December, two more Airbus A320s were added to the fleet. In 2013, Avion Express successfully passed the IOSA Operational Safety Audit and consequently obtained an IATA registration. The last Saab 340 cargo aircraft was removed from operation in March 2013. By summer of 2014, the airline was operating a fleet of 9 Airbus A320s and 2 Airbus A319s. That same year Avion Express established a subsidiary company Dominican Wings, a low-cost airline based in Santo Domingo, Dominican Republic. In summer 2017 Avion Express introduced Airbus A321 aircraft to the company's fleet.

In June 2017, Avion Express announced that it had sold its 65% stake in Dominican Wings to the President of the company, Mr. Victor Pacheco.

In 2019 Avion Express established Avion Express Malta, a subsidiary company based in Malta. The company started operations in May and currently operates 8 Airbus A320 and A321 aircraft.

Crew training
In August 2017, Avion Express signed partnership agreement with the Lithuanian Aviation Academy (VGTU A. Gustaitis’ Aviation Institute). The main focus of the partnership is providing students of Aircraft Piloting and technical programmes with opportunities to learn more about aviation and the company, to gain experience while doing internships and to join the airline after their studies. Since autumn 2017 Avion Express has also been collaborating with BAA Training on the cadet programme for people with little or no flying experience. According to this partnership, BAA Training is training and providing pilots to fill the vacancies for the expanding fleet of Avion Express.  In April 2019, Avion Express announced the launch of its first MPL Training Programme with BAA Training.

Destinations

Fleet 

As of Nov 2022, Avion Express operates the following fleet:

As of Nov 2022, Avion Express Malta operates the following fleet:

References

External links

Airlines of Lithuania
Aircraft leasing companies
Airlines established in 2005
Lithuanian companies established in 2005